Beasley Fork is an unincorporated community in Adams County, in the U.S. state of Ohio.

History
A post office called Beasleys Fork was established in 1855 and remained in operation until 1902. The community has the name of Beasley Fork, a tributary of Ohio Brush Creek. Charles Stevenson had family members living in the community; his son, William Stevenson, and his wife, Hannah Miller, his son Charles and his wife, Christina Collings, and Mary Stevenson. Charles Fields was one of the community's first settlers. James Collings built a house that overlooked the valley but is no longer there. Another log cabin was built on the ridge east of the community's turnpike by General Darlinton. Union Methodist Episcopal Church was organized in 1856, while Beasley's Fork Christian Church was organized in 1864, with the present-day building being erected in 1871. Nathaniel Foster, Sr. also settled in the community. Elliot H. Collins was a member of the local Christian church. The first infirmary in the county was founded on G.L. Compton's farm in March of 1837. It covered  of land and was sold for $2 million. Henry Smith bought  of land at the mouth of the river. Leonard Cole grew up in the community and his house overlooked the valley. Edward Burbage purchased a farm in the community, as well. James Miller was the community's postmaster. John Knox also owned a home in the community. James Hemphill settled in the community in 1797. Robert A. Mitchell was born in Beasley's Fork, and his father owned and operated a sawmill and gristmill.

Geography 
Beasley Fork is located at the mouth of Beasley's Fork in Green and Jefferson Townships. Beasley Fork is the home of a glen that is noted for its redbud coves and its redbird inhabitants.

Education
Beasley Fork is served by the Adams County/Ohio Valley School District. Children in the community attend West Union Elementary School and West Union High School in nearby West Union.

References

Unincorporated communities in Adams County, Ohio
1855 establishments in Ohio
Populated places established in 1855
Unincorporated communities in Ohio